Doctor Manuel Enrique Araujo (12 October 1865 – 9 February 1913) was a Salvadoran doctor and politician who served as the President of El Salvador from 1 March 1911 until his assassination on 9 February 1913. 

He was the first civilian president elected in El Salvador since Rafael Zaldívar was deposed by the military in 1885. During his presidency, he attempted to implement various social reforms and the current flag of El Salvador was adopted.

Early life 

Manuel Enrique Araujo was born in on 12 October 1865 in Condadillo in the department of Usulután, El Salvador. His father was Manuel Enrique Araujo and his mother was Juana Rodríguez de Araujo. He was baptized on 22 September 1865 in the Tecapa church. 

His family were wealthy landowners who cultivated coffee; his father was of Basque and his mother of Portuguese descent. As a young man he studied medicine at the University of El Salvador, and after earning his doctorate in 1891 at age 26, he went to Europe to continue his studies specializing in surgery.

Early political career 

In 1907, Araujo was elected as vice president of El Salvador, serving under President Fernando Figueroa. He assumed office on 1 March of the same year. Araujo ran for president in the 1910 election as the favored candidate, but without Figueroa's support. Despite the opposition of Guatemalan President Manuel Estrada Cabrera, Araujo won the election.

Presidency 

On 1 March 1911, Araujo became president of El Salvador, the first civilian to assume office since Rafael Zaldívar was deposed by the military on 14 May 1885. He selected Onofre Durán Santillana to be his vice president. He also permitted Prudencio Alfaro Menéndez to return to the country after being in exile since his defeat in the War of 1907.

During his presidency, the Army received special attention and increased funding; consequently, many foreign military advisors were hired to educate and train Salvadoran officers. In 1912, Araujo founded the National Guard as a rural police force for the country. Former officers of the Spanish Civil Guard were recruited to train them and to provide men for his private security corps.

In a reorganization of the national judicial system, offices of Justices of the Peace were established in all the country's municipalities to ensure the rule of law throughout the nation. A Ministry of Agriculture was formed to promote the cultivation of coffee. In 1911, the Teatro Nacional (National Theatre) was built in San Salvador, and the centenary of the independence uprising of 1811 was celebrated with the inauguration of the Monumento a los Próceres de 1811 (Monument to the Heroes of 1811) in Plaza Libertad (Freedom Park) to memorialize the heroes of the movement. The current national flag and the coat of arms it contains were adopted in 1912.

Assassination 

On 9 February 1913, during a concert in the San Salvador Bolivar Park (now Plaza Gerardo Barrios), President Araujo was severely wounded when farmers Mulatilo Virgilio, Fermin Perez and Fabian Graciano assaulted him with machetes. Araujo died five days later and was buried in one of El Salvador's famous cemeteries. The motives of the attackers, who were executed after a military trial, were never thoroughly investigated. Alfaro Menéndez, who was accused of being involved in the assassination, fled the country and would not return until 1915.

Personal life 

Araujo married Hortensia Peralta Lagos at an unknown date.

See also 

Arturo Araujo Fajardo, a distant relative who also served as President of El Salvador in 1931

References

Citations

Bibliography

External links 

Manuel Enrique Araujo. Presidente 1911–1913 (2004), short biography in Spanish, University of Central America

1865 births
1913 deaths
People from Usulután Department
Presidents of El Salvador
Vice presidents of El Salvador
Salvadoran people of Basque descent
Salvadoran people of Portuguese descent
Salvadoran surgeons
Deaths by blade weapons
People murdered in El Salvador
Assassinated Salvadoran politicians
1913 crimes in El Salvador
1913 murders in North America
1910s murders in El Salvador